Thomas Weir Templeton (November 8, 1867 – September 5, 1935) was a Republican member of the U.S. House of Representatives from Pennsylvania.

Biography
Thomas Weir Templeton was born in Plymouth, Pennsylvania, a son of Hugh Templeton and his wife, Christiana Weir. He graduated from Wyoming Seminary in Kingston, Pennsylvania. He studied law, was admitted to the bar in 1899 but did not practice.  He served as prothonotary of Luzerne County, Pennsylvania, from 1904 to 1907.  He engaged in business as a florist at Kingston.

Templeton was elected as a Republican to the Sixty-fifth Congress.  He was not a candidate for renomination in 1918.  He became superintendent of grounds and buildings at the Pennsylvania State Capitol in 1920 through 1923.  He resumed the florist business in Kingston and died in Plymouth.  He was interred in Edgehill Cemetery in West Nanticoke, Pennsylvania.

References

Sources

The Political Graveyard

1867 births
1935 deaths
People from Plymouth, Pennsylvania
Pennsylvania prothonotaries
Republican Party members of the United States House of Representatives from Pennsylvania